Maxayn was an American soul group of the 1970s. The band took its name from the lead singer Maxayn Lewis (born Paulette Parker), former Ikette and wife of band keyboardist Andre Lewis. The band also included Marlo Henderson (guitar) and Emry Thomas (drums). Andre and Henderson had previously played on the 1970 Buddy Miles Express albums A Message To The People and Them Changes. Maxayn released three albums on Capricorn Records between 1972 and 1974, which were distributed by Warner Bros Records. They signed to Manticore Records in 1975. A new single titled "Spirit Groove" was expected from their fourth album, but contractual issues derailed the project. Andre signed to Motown and recorded disco funk albums under the name Mandré.

In 2017, Cherry Red Records released the compilation album Reloaded: The Complete Recordings 1972-1974.

Discography (US)

References

American soul musical groups